Yasmine Mohammed is a Canadian university instructor, human rights activist and author. Mohammed, who escaped from a forced, abusive marriage to Al-Qaeda operative Essam Marzouk, became an advocate for women's rights through her non-profit organization Free Hearts, Free Minds. She is a member of the Center for Inquiry Speaker's Bureau and on the board of advisory for the Brighter Brains Institute.

Through her initiative Free Hearts, Free Minds she supports closeted ex-Muslims from Muslim-majority countries and co-ordinates an online campaign called #NoHijabDay against World Hijab Day.  She also has a website and hosts an online series on YouTube called Forgotten Feminists.

Mohammed has been interviewed by Sam Harris, Seth Andrews, and several news outlets from multiple countries, and in 2019 self-published the book Unveiled: How Western Liberals Empower Radical Islam.

Family and early life
Yasmine's mother is Egyptian, the niece of former President Mohammed Naguib, and her father is Palestinian, born in Gaza. She was born in Vancouver, British Columbia.

According to Mohammed's autobiography, her family lived a secular life until her father left when she was two, leaving her mother with three young children. Yasmine's mother sought community and support from a local mosque, where she met a man who said he would support her. He was already married, with three of his own children, and Yasmine's mother became his second wife. Yasmine was nine at the time, and states that her mother's situation improved, because her new husband was not abusive towards her like her first husband was. However, Yasmine states in an interview with Sam Harris that her step-father was physically abusive towards her and her siblings. She stated that her mother became what could be described as a "born-again" Muslim, which changed Mohammed's life. She was no longer permitted to go outside to play with her friends and she had to pray five times per day. She was forced to wear a hijab and was beaten for failing to memorize the Quran. She started attending an Islamic school that was established in the mosque. When she was 13, she told a trusted teacher about the abuse she was experiencing and showed him her bruises. The police were called and the case went to court, but Mohammed states that the judge ruled that because her family was Arab, they had the right to discipline her in that manner. She states that it made her feel that she didn't matter as much as other children due to this negligence from the Canadian authorities.

Yasmine has often described the way she was raised as "evil". She started wearing the niqāb at the age of 19, after being introduced to her future husband.

Forced marriage to an Al-Qaeda operative
When Yasmine was 20, she was forced to marry Al-Qaeda operative Essam Marzouk, and had a daughter with him. She later escaped the marriage to protect her daughter from the threat of female genital mutilation. She changed their names and moved to a different city, as she was worried that her daughter would be kidnapped and raised a Muslim. Even though she believed her husband was in prison she remained frightened because he was a member of Al-Qaeda. Following her escape, she secured student loans and attended the University of British Columbia, where she took a history of religion class and started to examine Islam more critically for the first time.

Activism

Yasmine decided to start speaking out after she watched Ben Affleck and Sam Harris debate Islam on Real Time with Bill Maher. She has criticized both Islam and the left - that she accuses of inadvertently enabling radical Islam through their work to fight Islamophobia. Mohammed is a vocal opponent to the practice of wearing a burka or hijab, as well as attempts to promote its use, viewing the hijab as "a tool of oppression, a garment that perpetuates rape culture". To protest against World Hijab Day, she promoted the hashtag #NoHijabDay as a social media extension of a campaign launched by Maryam Namazie and the Council of Ex-Muslims.

Yasmine also raised money to accommodate Rahaf Mohammed, an asylum seeker who fled to Canada from Saudi Arabia to escape her abusive family. According to Erich J. Prince, Mohammed has become a frequent commentator on Islam's relationship with the West, particularly in Canada.

Yasmine was a witness at the Standing Committee on Canadian Heritage on November 8, 2017 regarding the inclusion of the word Islamaphobia in Motion 103. She indicated that the motion's aim is "...to quell bigotry against human beings." but she argued that the term “Islamophobia” does not protect Muslims but protects the ideology of Islam. Mohammed was one of several witnesses that cautioned committee members to not be in a rush to legislate because of an "increasing public climate of hate and fear." Mohammed and other witnesses recommended that existing laws need to be enforced and strengthened to curb hatred and discrimination for all Canadians and not just one group of Canadians.

In 2017, Yasmine contributed an essay called Unholy Alliance: Why do left-wing Americans support right-wing Muslims? to SEDAA: Our Voices, a platform that features writers of Muslim Heritage, where she writes about her story and issues facing ex-Muslims.
 
According to the Jerusalem Post, Mohammed is a significant voice in the ex-Muslim community, speaking to audiences worldwide.

No Hijab Day 
Yasmine is the founder of the hashtag campaign called No Hijab Day or Free From Hijab Day celebrated on February 1, a hashtag campaign to raise awareness about the girls and women who want to take off their hijabs but cannot or who have already taken it off and are facing the consequences thereof.

Free Hearts, Free Minds
Yasmine founded a non-profit organization called Free Hearts, Free Minds that helps ex-Muslims living in Muslim-majority countries with state-sanctioned death penalties for leaving Islam. The organization provides psychological counselling for people leaving Islam, especially focusing on providing services to women from Saudi Arabia and LGBT individuals from the Muslim world.

Forgotten Feminists 
Yasmine is also a host of the online series "Forgotten Feminists", a series interviewing women about their experiences upon leaving Islam.

Publication
Mohammed wrote a memoir titled Unveiled: How Western Liberals Empower Radical Islam. that was self-published on 25 September 2019. She received two years of rejection letters before being convinced by Sam Harris to self-publish. The memoir outlines her upbringing in a fundamentalist, Islamic household in Canada, her step-father beating the bottoms of her feet for not reciting her prayers correctly, being married against her will to an Al-Qaeda operative, her escape and subsequent activism.

In an interview with Seth Andrews, host of The Thinking Atheist podcast, Andrews questioned her choice of title. Because not all western liberals empower radical Islam, he thought the title could have been Unveiled: How Many Western Liberals Empower Radical Islam. Mohammed responded that a more accurate title for the book could have been How Some Western Liberals Unintentionally Empower Radical Islam but this would not have captured sufficient attention.

Personal life
Yasmine has since remarried and has two daughters, one from her first marriage and one from her second. She severed ties with her mother after her mother threatened to kill her because she wouldn't wear hijab anymore and because she had become a non-believer.

Bibliography

See also 
 2017–2019 Iranian protests against compulsory hijab
 Ayaan Hirsi Ali 
 Masih Alinejad 
 Rita Panahi 
 Ex-Muslims
 International Women's Day
 List of former Muslims
 Maryam Namazie
 Motion 103
 My Stealthy Freedom
 Criticism of World Hijab Day

References

External links

 Yasmine Mohammed at the Canadian Heritage Committee
 Free Hearts, Free Minds
 Interview by Andrew Bolt on Sky News Australia 3 September 2020
 Interview by Triggernometry UK 23 November 2020

Living people
Canadian atheism activists
Canadian feminists
Canadian secularists
Canadian critics of Islam
20th-century atheists
21st-century Canadian non-fiction writers
21st-century Canadian women writers
21st-century atheists
Former Muslim critics of Islam
Atheist feminists
People from Vancouver
Women's rights support from the irreligious
Former Muslims turned agnostics or atheists
Hijab
Sexuality in Islam
Canadian women non-fiction writers
Year of birth missing (living people)
University of British Columbia alumni